Mikhail Zamotin (born 14 November 1937 in Leningrad) is a Soviet-born, Russian sprint canoeist who competed in the 1960s. At the 1968 Summer Olympics in Mexico City, he won a bronze medal in the C-2 1000 m event.

Zamotin also won a complete set of medals at the ICF Canoe Sprint World Championships with a gold (C-1 10000 m: 1963), a silver (C-2 1000 m: 1963), and a bronze (C-1 10000 m: 1966).

References

External links

1937 births
Sportspeople from Saint Petersburg
Canoeists at the 1968 Summer Olympics
Living people
Russian male canoeists
Soviet male canoeists
Olympic canoeists of the Soviet Union
Olympic bronze medalists for the Soviet Union
Olympic medalists in canoeing
ICF Canoe Sprint World Championships medalists in Canadian
Medalists at the 1968 Summer Olympics